This article lists the main weightlifting events and their results for 2013.

World & Grand Prix weightlifting championships
 April 7 – ?: 2013 Youth World Weightlifting Championships in  Tashkent
  won both the gold and overall medal tallies.
 May 3 – ?: 2013 Junior World Weightlifting Championships in  Lima
  won the gold medal tally.  won the overall medal tally.
 October 16 – ?: 2013 World Weightlifting Championships in  Wrocław
  and  won 6 gold medals each. Russia won the overall medal tally.
 November 21 – ?: 2013 IWF Grand Prix #1 in  Moscow
 Men's 94 kg winner:  Ramazan Rasulov
 Men's 105 kg winner:  Maksim Sheiko
 Men's +105 kg winner:  Mohamed Ihsan
 Women's 75 kg winner:  Lydia Valentín
 Women's +75 kg winner:  Tatiana Kashirina
 December 6 – ?: 2013 IWF Grand Prix #2 in  Baku
 Men's 62 kg winner:  Ruslan Makarov
 Men's 69 kg winner:  Sergey Petrov
 Women's 53 kg winner:  Iulia Paratova
 Women's 58 kg winner:  WANG Shuai

Continental & regional weightlifting championships
 April 8 – ?: 2013 European Weightlifting Championships in  Tirana
  won both the gold and overall medal tallies.
 May 26 – ?: 2013 Asian Youth Weightlifting Championships in  Doha
  won both the gold and overall medal tallies.
 June 20 – ?: 2013 Asian Weightlifting Championships in  Astana
  won both the gold and overall medal tallies.
 June 26 – ?: 2013 Pan American Weightlifting Championships in  Caracas
  won both the gold and overall medal tallies.
 July 1 – ?: 2013 Asian Junior Weightlifting Championships in  Bishkek
  won both the gold and overall medal tallies.
 July 12 – ?: 2013 Oceania Senior, Junior, & Youth Weightlifting Championships in  Brisbane
 Senior:  and  won 4 gold medals each.  won the overall medal tally.
New Zealand won the overall medal tally.
 Youth:  and  won 3 gold medals each. Australia won the overall medal tally.
 July 29 – ?: 2013 South American & Pan American Junior Weightlifting Championships in  Santiago
 South American:  won both the gold and overall medal tallies.
 Pan American:  and  won 4 gold medals each.  won the overall medal tally.
 September 1 – ?: 2013 European U17 Weightlifting Championships in  Klaipėda
  won both the gold and overall medal tallies.
 September 3 – ?: 2013 Pan American Youth Weightlifting Championships in  Cancún
  and  won 7 gold medals each. Mexico won the overall medal tally.
 September 23 – ?: 2013 European Junior Weightlifting Championships in  Tallinn
  won both the gold and overall medal tallies.
 October 28 – ?: 2013 African Senior, Junior, & Youth Weightlifting Championships in  Casablanca
 Senior:  won the gold medal tally. Tunisia and  won 10 overall medals each.
 Junior:  won the gold medal tally.  won the overall medal tally.
 Youth:  won both the gold and overall medal tallies.
 November 16 – ?: 2013 South American Weightlifting Championships in  Chiclayo
  won the gold medal tally. Colombia and  won 12 overall medals each.
 November 24 – ?: 2013 Commonwealth Senior, Junior, & Youth Weightlifting Championships in  Penang
 Senior:  won the gold medal tally.  won the overall medal tally.
 Junior:  won both the gold and overall medal tallies.
 Youth:  won both the gold and overall medal tallies.

References

External links
 International Weightlifting Federation Website

 
Weightlifting by year
2013 in sports